Ira Sachs (born November 21, 1965) is an American filmmaker. His first film was the short Lady (1993).

Biography
Sachs was born in Memphis, Tennessee. His films include  The Delta (1997),  Forty Shades of Blue (2005),  Married Life (2007), Keep the Lights On (2012), Love Is Strange (2014), and Little Men (2016). His newest film, Frankie, premiered at Cannes in 2019. His next film, Passages, is set to be released in 2022.

Sachs is Jewish and openly gay.  He described Keep the Lights On as semi-autobiographical film. In January 2012, Sachs married artist Boris Torres in New York city, a few days before their twins were born. Sachs and Torres co-parent the children with documentary cinematographer and filmmaker Kirsten Johnson, who bore them.

He appeared in the German documentary Wie ich lernte die Zahlen zu lieben/How I Learned to Love the Numbers (2014) by Oliver Sechting and Max Taubert.

Filmography
As a Director

Awards and nominations

References

External links
 

1965 births
Living people
American male screenwriters
LGBT Jews
American LGBT screenwriters
People from Memphis, Tennessee
LGBT people from Tennessee
American gay writers
Jewish American writers
English-language film directors
Film directors from Tennessee
Screenwriters from Tennessee
LGBT film directors
21st-century American Jews